Livingston Matthews, known professionally as Pink Siifu, and occasionally iiye, is an American rapper and singer from Cincinnati, Ohio, and Birmingham, Alabama.

Life and career
Matthews gained an appreciation for music from his family while dividing his time between Birmingham and Cincinnati in his youth.  His father, a saxophone player, introduced Matthews to classic jazz while his mother and older brother introduced him to R&B and hip-hop respectively. New Orleans–based rapper Lil Wayne was his favorite artist. Matthews played the trumpet and drums in marching bands throughout his youth. After high school, he was a theater major at Wright State University in Fairborn, Ohio, a suburb of Dayton. However, he chose to leave the university to focus on a rap career. He started performing in Cincinnati under the name 'Liv Martez' before moving to Los Angeles in 2013 after recording in studios there, including working on a project with Syd tha Kyd. 

He began releasing music under the name Pink Siifu in 2014, while also producing under the name iiye. Matthews released several projects between 2014 and 2018.

In 2018, Matthews released Ensley under the Pink Siifu moniker to critical acclaim. He named the LP after Ensley, Alabama, a suburb of Birmingham where his grandmother lived. Ensley received a placement on Pitchfork's best rap albums of 2018 list. His next release was the album NEGRO. Initially titled To Be Angry, the album has been described as a "shrill and abrasive" blend of jazz, punk rock, and rap. Siifu's most recent album, Gumbo'!, featured his studio album debut alongside artists Georgia Anne Muldrow and Nick Hakim. It also featured production by Monte Booker, The Alchemist, and others. In 2021, Matthews directed a short film titled 'NATION TYME!', an experimental film centered on an excerpt from famed writer Amiri Baraka's essay 'It's Nation Time'.

Style and influences
Pink Siifu has been described as having a slow and lackadaisical delivery to his vocals, a quality he attributes to the influence of Mos Def, Lil Wayne, and Outkast. Siifu's music has generally been described as alternative hip-hop and neo-soul, but he has experimented with other genres, including punk on his 2020 release, NEGRO. Outside hip-hop, Matthews has listed George Clinton, Alice Coltrane, Sun Ra, Pixies, Radiohead, and Death Grips among his influencers.

Discography

Albums
VCR@aol.jazz: A decade's letter to the Galaxy  (2014)
Zin  (2014)
Zen  (2014)
No/more LOVE  (2014)
UaReL. (2015)
Space ghetto (2016)
Ensley (2018)
NEGRO (2020)
Gumbo'! (2021)

Collaborative albums
Twothousandnine  (2016)
BRWN  (2017)
Black Sand  (2019)
Bag Talk  (2020)
FlySiifu's  (2020)
$mokebreak  (2021)
Real Bad Flights  (2022)

Extended plays
A maze btw time  (2014)
Year 19803711967  (2014)
Allway[v]ez  (2015)
Reggie,Ernest,Wester,Rusty  (2015)
A second definatelycaughtin between love x fear  (2015)
Bround/brown  (2016)
Giiift Wrap:VoL.1  (2016)
Black food 1  (2016)
Old'focus  (2016)
Tape  (2016)
In between.  (2016)
A'lady. 1  (2016)
Let go (2016)
In between.  (2016)
Black food 2  (2017)
Lil'likeluv.1  (2017)
Grden.1  (2017)
A'lady. 2  (2017)
black food 3  (2017)
Lil'likeluv.2  (2017)
Drnk  (2017)
Head (2017)
Slwdwn Vol. 1  (2017)
Lil'likeluv.3  (2018)
Uptwn.1  (2018)
Slwdwn Vol. 2  (2018)
Southern.  (2018)
A'lady. 3  (2018)
Uptwn.2  (2018)
Dollaz.1  (2018)
Im still. (2018)
Black food 4  (2019)
Uptwn.3  (2018)
Use.  (2019)
Slwdwn Vol. 3  (2019)
Dollaz.2  (2020)
Grden.3  (2020)
Lil'SidePeace.  (2020)
Lil'likeluv.4  (2020)
Dollaz.3  (2020)
Uptwn.4  (2021)

Singles
"Blvck Space Pink vol.1"  (2015)
"Heart on my face" (2017)
"Halos/Bills"  (2017)
"Cocoa"  (2018)
"Cement"  (2020)
"Dollar Dr. Dream"  (2020)
"Richard Pryor"  (2020)
"Mind Right" featuring Liv.e  (2020)
"Blame"  (2021)
"Minnie Lives"  (2021)
"Table 42" featuring Pink Siifu  (2021)
"lng hair dnt care" (2021)
"Bussin' (Cold)"  (2021)
"48"  (2022)
"Looking for Water" featuring Boldy James  (2022)
"Pour The Wine" featuring Peso Gordon & Chuck Strangers  (2022)
"L's (Eyedress Remix)" featuring Fousheé  (2022)
Bonded  (2022)
"Cnt Go Back (Tell Me)"  (2023)

References

Living people
Rappers from Cincinnati
Rappers from Ohio
Rappers from Alabama
1992 births
Musicians from Cincinnati
Musicians from Birmingham, Alabama
African-American male rappers
Southern hip hop musicians
African-American male songwriters
Songwriters from Alabama
Songwriters from Ohio
21st-century American male musicians